The Piano Concerto No. 3 in E-flat major, Op. 29 by Camille Saint-Saëns, was composed in 1869. The concerto is written in 3 movements. When the concerto was first performed by Saint-Saëns himself at the Leipzig Gewandhaus on 27 November 1869 it was not well received, possibly because of its harmonic experimentation. It is not as often performed as his famous second concerto or the fourth or fifth concertos, but it is still an important addition to the piano concerto repertoire.  It was dedicated to Élie-Miriam Delaborde, a pianist who is believed to have been the natural son of Charles-Valentin Alkan.

Overview 
The piece follows standard concerto form. The first movement is brisk and in sonata form, the second movement is slow, and the third movement is fast. The length of the concerto is approximately 29 minutes.

The three movements of the concerto are:

Instrumentation
The work is scored for 2 flutes, 2 oboes, 2 clarinets, 2 bassoons, 2 horns, 2 trumpets, 3 trombones, timpani and strings.

Notes

Recordings

 Aldo Ciccolini, piano, Orchestre de Paris, conducted by Serge Baudo. 2 CD Emi 1971. Choc de Classica 2019
 Philippe Entremont, piano, l'Orchestre du Capitole de Toulouse, conducted by Michel Plasson. 2 CD CBS 1976
 Pascal Rogé, piano, London Philharmonic Orchestra, conducted by Charles Dutoit. 2 CD Decca 1986.
 Stephen Hough, piano,  City of Birmingham Symphony Orchestra, conducted by Sakari Oramo. 2 CD Hyperion 2000 - 2001. Gramophone Awards record of the year 2002. Diapason d'Or, Choc Le Monde de la Musique.
 Alexandre Kantorow, piano, Tapiola Sinfonietta, conducete by Jean-Jacques Kantorow (with piano concertos n°4 & 5). CD Bis 2019. Diapason d'or, Choc de Classica.

External links
 Piano Concerto No. 3 (Saint-Saëns) Free scores at the International Music Score Library Project.
 Pianopedia entry

Piano concerto 3
1869 compositions
Compositions in E-flat major